One Pattern (stylized as ONE PATTERN) is a 1986 album by P-Model and the last before the band's hiatus in 1988.

Background
After the end of the supporting tour for Karkador, P-Model was left without a bassist and a keyboardist. Frontman Susumu Hirasawa recruited Teruo Nakano and Yoshikazu Takahashi to fill the roles respectively, taking P-Model's sound in a new direction.

One Pattern's style follows closely after Hirasawa's work in Karkador, with Nakano as the main creative partner. Together, they employed varied musical styles, from orchestral to classic guitar work, while producing in a way as to create a lo-fi sound.

Production
Due to the rising prominence of digital technology at the time, artificial sounds were used on the album more so than ever before. The songs were recorded with a Casio CZ-5000's built-in 8 track sequencer, as the band could not afford a standalone. For reproducing the sound for live performances they relied on intuition and using the devices they had on hand.

Hirasawa implemented a MIDI guitar on some songs, sometimes purposefully playing it "the wrong way" aiming to surprise the listener, though he struggled with the unreliability of the gear and its constant sound output delay. The complex basslines were played by Nakano on either a bass or on a keyboard. Takahashi took to heavy usage of samplers and using a cassette deck to play pre-recorded choral accompaniments, as well as having a hand in engineering. Drummer Yasuhiro Araki meanwhile, had his role in the band greatly diminished, with most of the drumming on the album handled by sequencers.

One Pattern was recorded under a strenuous schedule by a P-Model in low spirits, with Hirasawa having his vision heavily imposed on by various circumstances, and he has since called this his least favorite P-Model album. This was reflected in the album's title, "one pattern" being a Japanese phrase for "stuck in a rut".

Track listing

Personnel
 P-Model - Arrangements, Backing vocals on "Drums"
Susumu Hirasawa - Vocal, Keyboards, Guitar
Yasuhiro Araki - Drums, Gong Bass, Percussion
 - Bass, Keyboards, Lead vocals on "LICORICE LEAF" and "Möbius band", Backing vocals
Yoshikazu Takahashi - Systems (Keyboards, Sampler, Cassette deck, Backing vocals, Engineering)

 Guest musicians & production
Kayo "Kokubo" Matsumoto - "MAMA" Vocal on "OH MAMA!"
 (credited as "Suginami Jido Gassho-Dan") - "Sunpaleets" Voice
Masami Orimo (listed under special thanks) - Backing vocals on "Drums" 
Akiro "Kamio" Arishima (AC Unit) - Keyboards on "Another Day", Production
Akitsugu Doi (Alfa Records) - Mixing, Engineering
Katsunori Takashima (Alfa Records) and Nobuo Namie (Freedom Studio) - Assistant Engineering
Mitsuharu Kobayashi (CBS-Sony) - Mastering Engineer

 Staff
Toshikazu Awano (Alfa Records) - A&R Coordination
Mitsuru Hirose (Model House) - Artist Management
Yūichi Hirasawa - Art director
Tatsuo Kuda - Photography
Akemi Tsujitani (AC Unit) - Costumer
Special Thanks: Yoshiaki Kondo (Gok Sound), Akai,  (Tōkai Gakki), Taro Yamamoto, Imagica

Release history

"Another Day" is included on the TWINS SOUND SAMPLER Vol.2～ROCK/POPS COLLECTION various artists compilation.
"OH MAMA!" is included on the TWINS SOUND SAMPLER Vol.4～TECHNO POP COLLECTION various artists compilation.

References

External links
ONE PATTERN at NO ROOM - The official site of Susumu Hirasawa (P-MODEL)

ONE PATTERN at Sony Music's official site

1986 albums
P-Model albums
Alfa Records albums
Japanese-language albums